Williams Fork may refer to a river in the U.S. state of Colorado:

Williams Fork (Colorado River)
Williams Fork (Yampa River)